The 61st Regiment Farm fire (Chinese: 61团场火灾) was a fire occurred at the Chinese New Year at 20:15 local time, 18 February 1977 in a hall showing a communist war movie in Xinjiang, China. The regiment farm was a military-agricultural colony run by the Xinjiang 61st regiment, hence, most deaths were the children of the troops. Among the 1,600 schoolchildren in the farm, 597 were dead. In total 694 died and 161 became disabled, making it the deadliest fire in the People's Republic of China. The fire started when a pile of wreaths for the late Mao Zedong, undisposed for 5 months since his funeral, were set off by a child celebrating the 1977 Chinese New Year. Nobody disposed the wreaths for fear of being accused of disrespectful to the paramount leader and then being thrown to denunciation rallies.

Background

61st Regiment
The 61st Regiment of the Xinjiang Production and Construction Corps stationed in Alimali, now in the northeastern suburb of Khorgas City, Ili Prefecture. When the fire broke out in 1977, the "regiment farm", a military-agricultural colony, was supervised and investigated by the Communist Committee of Ili Prefecture.

Exits of the hall
The festival hall was built in 1966. In 1972, a vertical gallery was added outside the main door of the hall with two cylindrical pillars a metre wide. The hall originally had 17 large windows and seven doors. For an informational session on farming, the hall was modified in March 1975, bricking the lower part of the windows, leaving only 17  by  windowless holes, because the management had believed the floor to ceiling windows to be impractical. This made it difficult for people to escape, as the height to overcome became greater. In February 1976, the hall underwent further modification, during which three of the doors were sealed and the other three were either locked or bound with steel wire, leaving only a  main door on the south side of the building.

Fire 
In 1977, according to the Chinese calendar, the New Year was celebrated on 18 February. Local cooperatives sold a large number of firecrackers for the event.

When the fire occurred, the rear half of the hall was still occupied by the wreaths placed in September 1976 while mourning the death of Mao Zedong, and the main door had apparently been half sealed, ostensibly to maintain order, leaving only an  opening.

At around 19:30 Xinjiang Time (21:30 Beijing Time), the movie started. At 20:15 Xinjiang Time, a primary school student, Zhao Guanghui, lit a "ground rat", a special type of firecracker that could jump after being set off. On this occasion, it sprang into the pile of wreaths, setting the wreaths on fire. The fire climbed to the ceiling, with the projection screen and wires mounted on the roof rapidly igniting, spreading dense smoke in the hall. The burning wooden panels fell and asphalt started falling off the roof. Due to the only exit being too small, most people were unable to escape, leading to high levels of casualties. According to witnesses it took only half an hour from the start of the fire to the roof collapse.

After the fire broke out, on 19 February 1977, the Yili Military District phoned Huocheng and Huiyuan Counties, and the Yili Military District 8th Border Guards Regiment, requesting assistance at the 61st Division. Two companies from the 8th Regiment arrived, with around 280 soldiers. Each soldier was armed with a pickaxe, a crowbar and two masks.

After a cleanup lasting around four hours, the job was mostly done. The deceased were placed in the yard surrounding the ruins of the hall.

Casualties 
In total 694 died and 161 became disabled, making it the deadliest fire in the People's Republic of China. Among the 1,600 schoolchildren in the regiment's farm, 597 were dead. The stack was made worse by those who brought their own chairs to watch the movie, which further blocked exits. Eventually, a hole was smashed in a sealed door on the northern side, allowing a few children to be rescued.

Settlement
The deputy party secretary of the Yili Farming Bureau, Ma Ji was the leading investigator for the "2.18" fire. He arrived at the on the morning of 19 February. Some relatives on site were angry, and tried placing the blame on Zhou Zhenfu, the local party secretary of Yili, unaware that he had lost his daughter in the fire. To calm the anger, at the end of February, Ma Ji also took the role of the party secretary of the 61st Division and took charge for the aftermath of the "2.18" fire. 

After all the deceased were buried, some families of the deceased remained angry, and plotted to exhume the corpse of the daughter of Zhou Zhenfu in protest. Ma Ji convinced the upper level leaders to not prosecute any of the protestors, and he resolved the disturbance through his grants for families of victims to take holidays or switch to other jobs.

Due to the sensitive nature of the news at the time, it was not heavily broadcast within China, although apparently it was already known by foreign media. The fire was initially blamed on Soviet revisionism, i.e. that it was set by class enemies. Afterwards, the fire was largely blamed on Zhao Guanghui, the child who set the firecracker, without seriously considering the effect of the abandoned wreaths.

Guanghui escaped unhurt before the main panic. Eventually, with his parents, he surrendered himself to the police. The month after the fire, he was sentenced to reform through labour and later to juvenile detention. After being released, he went to Guangdong. The people who organised the movie showing were detained for almost two and a half years, until the local court chose not to prosecute. The party officials responsible for the festival hall were demoted and sent to farms.

In July 1978, after the investigation was complete, Ma Ji was promoted to the deputy party secretary of Yining.

Memorials 
A memorial park, named Jianyuan started construction in 1997 after bulldozing the remains of the hall. It was designed to be a theme park on fire safety, but was yet to be finished in 2007.

The victims of the fire are buried at Sandapian, so named as this cemetery was formed by joining three pieces of land.

See also 
 List of fires in China
 List of building or structure fires
 List of structural failures and collapses
 1994 Karamay fire, 325 deaths
 2003 Hengyang fire, building partially collapsed in the fire

References 

February 1977 events
1977 fires in Asia
Building and structure fires in China
1977 in China
Theatre fires
20th century in Xinjiang
Fire disasters involving barricaded escape routes
Building collapses in China
Building collapses caused by fire
20th-century building collapses
Building and structure fires started by pyrotechnics
1977 disasters in China